Our Lady of the Angels School is a historic school in Albuquerque, New Mexico. It was built in 1878 and was added to the National Register of Historic Places in 1984.

References

School buildings on the National Register of Historic Places in New Mexico
School buildings completed in 1878
Buildings and structures in Albuquerque, New Mexico
National Register of Historic Places in Albuquerque, New Mexico
Schools in Albuquerque, New Mexico
1878 establishments in New Mexico Territory